Desnes may refer to:
Desnes, a historical province in Scotland, roughly equivalent to southern Kirkcudbrightshire
Desnes, Jura, a commune in the French region of Franche-comté
See also
Desne